The Works is a greatest hit compilation by the Canadian progressive rock band Saga. It was originally released in 1991 only to the German market, as a double CD and vinyl for Bon Aire Records.

It includes three new tracks - "Gotta Love It", "The Call" (both released as singles), and a cover of "Solsbury Hill."

All songs written by Saga except for "Solsbury Hill," which was written by Peter Gabriel.

CD 1

CD 2

LP 1 Side 1

LP 1 Side 2

LP 2 Side 1

LP 2 Side 2

Credits
 Michael Sadler – lead vocals
 Ian Crichton – guitars
 Jim Gilmour – keyboards, backing vocals
 Jim Crichton – bass, keyboards
 Steve Negus  – drums, percussion, Moog synthesizer
 Curt Cress - percussion, drums
 Peter Rochon - keyboards
 Gregg Chadd - keyboards

References

1991 albums
Saga (band) albums